Russell Glacier may refer to:
 Russell Glacier (Greenland)
 Russell Glacier (Oregon), in Cascade Range, Mount Jefferson, Oregon, USA
 Russell Glacier (Mount Rainier), in Cascade Range, Mount Rainier, Washington, USA